Bahramabad (also Romanized as Bahrāmābād; also known as Baramābād) is a village in Hendudur Rural District, Sarband District, Shazand County, Markazi Province, Iran. At the 2006 census, its population was 51, in 9 families.

References 

Populated places in Shazand County